Vive la Fête are a Belgian music duo from Ghent, East Flanders, formed in 1997 by Danny Mommens (guitar, vocals) and Els Pynoo (vocals).

History
Vive la Fête was founded in 1997 when Mommens (then still playing in his former band dEUS) met Els at a party hosted by or for her sister. He had previously been an acquaintance of Pynoo's sister, who had photographed Els naked and had later showed the picture to Mommens. As Els stated in a 2005 interview; Mommens had approached her in a normal fashion and said randomly: "Hey I saw you naked!" Mommen's recorded a few demos with Pynoo on his 8-track recorder. These demos were released on the EP Je ne veux pas (sometimes also referred to as Paris) which gathered some attention for its resemblance to '80s new wave music. Their first success came with their debut Attaque Surprise (2000). Later records such as République Populaire (2001) and Nuit Blanche (2003) made them popular, especially in the fashion world, where Karl Lagerfeld was one of their fans, and has enlisted them to perform at a number of his big shows in New York City and Paris. In 2005 they released Grand Prix and toured all over Europe and played some shows in Brazil and Mexico.

Discography

Studio albums

Compilation albums

Extended plays
 Je ne veux pas (Kinky Star, 1998)
 Tokyo (Surprise, 2000)
 Schwarzkopf Remix (Surprise, 2004)
 La vérité (Surprise, 2006)

References

External links

 
 
 

Belgian electronic music groups
Dance-punk musical groups
Electroclash groups
Electronic music duos
Belgian electronic rock musical groups
Musical groups established in 1997
Belgian synthpop groups
Belgian musical duos
Male–female musical duos